The Río Blanco (Spanish for "white river") is a river of Argentina that rises high in the mountains west of San José de Jáchal in the northern part of the province of San Juan. It is a tributary of the Jáchal River which empties into the Desaguadero River basin.

See also
List of rivers of Argentina

References
 Rand McNally, The New International Atlas, 1993.
  GEOnet Names Server

Rivers of Argentina